Scissurella costata is a species of minute sea snail, a marine gastropod mollusk in the family Scissurellidae.

Description
The size of the shell varies between 1 mm and 2.5 mm.
The thin, white shell is transparent. The spire is depressed, and composed of 4 whorls that are plane on their upper surfaces, strongly carinated at the periphery, and convex below the carina. The body whorl is very large, and  widely umbilicated. The oblique aperture is subquadrangular. The simple columella is arcuate. The simple lip is sinuous, with a narrow profound fissure. The slit fasciole forms the carina of the whorls, with elevated, lamellar edges, and arcuate growth lamellae. The umbilicus is broad and deep. It is carinated at the border. The surface is sculptured with arcuate longitudinal riblets, widely spaced and a little undulating, and fine spiral striae.

Distribution
This marine species occurs off Spain (Tenerife), Canary Islands), Portugal (Madeira)and in the Mediterranean Sea and the Adriatic Sea.

References

External links
 

Scissurellidae
Gastropods described in 1824